Lahiru Sandaruwan (born 14 October 1991) is a Sri Lankan cricketer. He made his first-class debut for Galle Cricket Club in the 2015–16 Premier League Tournament on 8 January 2016.

References

External links
 

1991 births
Living people
Sri Lankan cricketers
Galle Cricket Club cricketers
Cricketers from Colombo